PAG may stand for:

Science and Medicine
 Periaqueductal gray, an area of gray matter in the midbrain
 Polyacrylamide gel, a separation matrix used in electrophoresis
 Polyalkylene glycol, a type of synthetic oil
 Potential acoustic gain, a measure of sound reinforcement system performance
 Propylene glycol, an organic chemical compound

Transport
 Pagadian Airport, Philippines (by IATA code)
 Perimeter Aviation, Canadian airline (by ICAO code)
 Presidential Airlift Group

Organisations
 PAG, an Asia-focused Alternative Investment firm.
Penske Automotive Group under the New York Stock Exchange ticker symbol system
 Positive Action Group in Isle of Man politics
 Premier Automotive Group, a group within Ford Motor Company
 Protestant Action Group, a loyalist paramilitary organisation

Other
 Pan-Arab Games, a four-year Olympic games held between Arab OCs
 Pangasinan language, by ISO 639 code

See also
 Pag (disambiguation)
 Pags (disambiguation)
 P.Ag